Football 7-a-side at the 1992 Summer Paralympics consisted of a men's team event.

Medal summary

References 

 

 
Football
1992
1992 in association football
1992
1992–93 in Spanish football
1992–93 in Dutch football
1992–93 in Portuguese football
1992–93 in Republic of Ireland association football